Bagh-e Khoshk (also Romanized as Bāgh-e Khoshk and Bāgh Khoshk) is a village in Saadatabad Rural District, Pariz District, Sirjan County, Kerman Province, Iran. At the 2006 census, its population was 155, in 40 families.

References 

Populated places in Sirjan County